The Battle of Menotomy was an action on April 19, 1775 (the day of the Battles of Lexington and Concord, the opening day of the American Revolutionary War), in what is now Arlington, Massachusetts. 5,100 men from eastern Middlesex County and southern Essex County gathered in Menotomy to meet the retreating British troops on their way to Boston from Concord. 25 rebels and 40 British troops were killed in this battle. It was here in Menotomy that the first British soldiers were captured.

References

Menotomy
Menotomy